The Commercial C-1 Sunbeam was a long-range biplane used in record-setting flights of the 1920s.

Design
The conventional landing gear-equipped biplane featured a two-seat open cockpit and a four-passenger enclosed cabin. The fuselage is constructed with welded steel tubing with fabric covering. The wheels were covered with large streamlined wheel pants.

Operational history
On 27 November 1929 Elinor Smith and Bobbie Trout set a 42-hour endurance record over Los Angeles flying a C-1 Sunbeam refueled three times from a Curtiss Carrier Pigeon mail plane. Although the Sunbeam was performing well, the Carrier Pigeon support plane had mechanical difficulties after the third day. 672 gallons of fuel were used in the attempt, making Smith and Trout the first women to refuel in the air.

Variants
Commercial Sumbeam C-102
X-564M used a  Wright J-6 radial engine for the endurance flights of 1929 and 1931.

Specifications (Commercial C-1 Sunbeam)

References

1920s United States experimental aircraft